All She Ever Wanted is a 1996 television drama film directed by Michael Scott. It stars Marcia Cross as a young wife desperate for a child but cannot risk being pregnant because of the medication she must take to control her bi-polar disorder.

Cast
 Marcia Cross as Rachel Stockman 
 James Marshall as Tom Stockman 
 Leila Kenzle as Jessie Frank 
 Bruce Kirby 
 Carrie Snodgress as Alma Winchester 
 CCH Pounder as Dr. Marilyn Tower
 Tom Nowicki as Wesley Knight 
 Richard K. Olsen as Judge Atwater 
 Larry Black as Mr. Kelly 
 Howard Kingkade as Dr. Danzer 
 Ralph Wilcox as Hospital Security Guard 
 Robert Catrini as Hospital Orderly 
 Robby Preddy as Amy 
 Nancy McLoughlin as Nurse Green 
 Patricia Clay as Clara Fox

1996 television films
1996 films
American drama television films
1990s English-language films